Juan Federico Jiménez Mayor (born 5 August 1964) is a Peruvian politician who was Prime Minister of Peru from July 2012 to October 2013. He previously served as Minister of Justice and Human Rights, and was appointed to the post of Prime Minister on 23 July 2012 by President Ollanta Humala. He resigned his post on 29 October 2013, and was replaced by César Villanueva, Governor of the San Martín Region.

Education
Jiménez studied law at the Pontifical Catholic University of Peru. He also holds a master's degree in constitutional law.

Career
After graduation, he qualified for the bar. He is a human rights lawyer. He served as faculty member at his alma meter, Catholic University. In 2000, he was appointed Deputy Minister of Justice to interim government led by Valentín Paniagua. In August 2011, he was reappointed deputy justice minister. In December 2011, he became Minister of Justice and Human Rights. In his short stay at the ministry he dealt with several high-profile problems. From 2013 to 2016 he served as Permanent Representative of Peru to the Organization of American States.

References

|-

1964 births
Living people
Academic staff of the National University of San Marcos
20th-century Peruvian lawyers
Peruvian Ministers of Justice
Human rights ministers of Peru
Prime Ministers of Peru